Samuel Gelfman (May 30, 1931 – August 15, 2019) was an American film producer. He began his career by working for talent agent Candida Donadio, and he later worked for Cy Feuer and Ernest Martin. By the early 1970s, he had joined United Artists as vice president, where he worked on promoting films directed by Woody Allen and Sidney Lumet. He co-produced Caged Heat and Cockfighter with Roger Corman in 1974, and he produced Cannonball in 1976.

References

1931 births
2019 deaths
People from Brooklyn
People from Los Angeles
Princeton University alumni
Film producers from New York (state)